The Soueast A5 Yiwu (翼舞) is a compact sedan produced by Chinese manufacturer Soueast Motors since 2018 to replace the Soueast V5 Lingzhi.

Overview 
The A5 Yiwu was first launched during the 2018 Chengdu Auto Show in August 2018, with the production version of the A5 Yiwu launched in Q4 2018 being heavily based on its predecessor, the Soueast V5 Lingzhi sedan.

Powertrain
The A5 Yiwu is powered by a Mitsubishi-sourced 1.5 liter engine developing 120 hp and 143.0N· m and mated to a 5-speed manual transmission.

See also 
 Soueast V5 Lingzhi

References

External links 

A5
Cars introduced in 2018
Compact cars
Front-wheel-drive vehicles
Sedans
Vehicles with CVT transmission
2010s cars
Cars of China